The Canto River is a river of Rio Grande do Norte state in northeastern Brazil.

See also
List of rivers of Rio Grande do Norte

References
Brazilian Ministry of Transport

Rivers of Rio Grande do Norte